José María Lacalle García, known in Anglo America as Joseph M. Lacalle (November 17, 1859 – June 11, 1937) was a clarinetist, composer, conductor and music critic. He is best known for composing the song "Amapola". His surname is misspelled LaCalle in some sources.

Biography and career
José María Lacalle García was born in Cadiz, Spain, and emigrated to the United States in 1884, sailing from the Port of Havana, Cuba, to the Port of New York on the S/S Newport.. He performed on woodwind instruments with a number of popular bands including the John Philip Sousa Band, the Patrick Gilmore Band, the 7th Regiment Band, the Hoadley Musical Society Amateur Orchestra, and the Columbia Spanish Band. He conducted his own band, the Lacalle Band, and the 23rd Regiment Band. Lacalle directed instrumental groups for Columbia between 1917 and 1929, and participated in early recordings for other recording companies.

Lacalle composed numerous songs and marches, including "Twenty-third Regiment March" (1902), "Pobrecito Faraon" (1923), "Amapola" (1920), "Aquel Beso" (1927) and "The Light That Never Fails (Luz Eterna)" (1928).

"Amapola" was originally composed with Spanish lyrics and performed instrumentally. In the early 1940s "Amapola" was given English lyrics by Albert Gamse. The song was then recorded by a number of artists. Jimmy Dorsey recorded a version which hit #1 on the Billboard charts. "Amapola" went to #1 on Your Hit Parade in 1941.

In later life Lacalle worked as a music critic for Columbia Phonograph Company. He founded the Spanish Theater Company in Brooklyn and presented Zarzuelas to American audiences. He was also influential in promoting Spanish and Cuban music. He died in Brooklyn, New York in 1937 at the age of 76.

References

External links
The Clarinetists of the John Philip Sousa Band: 1892-1931

American male composers
American composers
American clarinetists
American conductors (music)
American male conductors (music)
Spanish emigrants to the United States
Musicians from Brooklyn
1860 births
1937 deaths
Classical musicians from New York (state)